Andriy Dmytrovych Nikitin (born 8 January 1972) is a retired Soviet and Ukrainian professional footballer.

References

External links
 
 
 Nikitin at allplayers.in.ua

1972 births
Living people
Footballers from Luhansk
Soviet footballers
Ukrainian footballers
Ukrainian Premier League players
FC Zorya Luhansk players
FC Shakhtar Donetsk players
FC Metalurh Donetsk players
FC Shakhtar-2 Donetsk players
FC Metalurh-2 Donetsk players
FC Mariupol players
Simurq PIK players
Ukrainian football managers
Association football goalkeepers